Bulu is an Oceanic language of West New Britain in Papua New Guinea.

References

Meso-Melanesian languages
Languages of West New Britain Province